

The Doblhoff/WNF 342 was the first helicopter to take off and land using tip jets to drive the rotor.

Development
The WNF 342 was designed for a German Navy requirement for an observation platform for use from small ships and submarines.

The conventional piston engine drove both a small propeller (to provide airflow across a rudder) and an air compressor to provide air (subsequently mixed with fuel) through the rotor head and hollow rotor blades to combustion chambers at the rotor tips.

Variants
V1/V2: The first helicopter was initially powered by a  engine (V1) and then a  engine (V2)—both by Walter Mikron.  It first flew in 1943, and was captured with V4 at Zell am See.

V3:  The second WNF 342 had a larger rotor and was destroyed during testing.V4: The last unit produced was a two-seat variant with new collective and cyclic controls. After 25 flight hours it was captured by United States forces and on July 19, 1945, shipped to the US under Operation Lusty on HMS Reaper (D82).

Specifications (V4)

See also

References

Vertical Rewind: Spoils of War

External links
Doblhoff WNF 342 V4 in scale of 1 : 11 as shown at the Helicopter Museum of Bückeburg

1940s Austrian experimental aircraft
1940s Austrian helicopters
Aircraft first flown in 1943
WNF 342
Tipjet-powered helicopters
Single-engined piston helicopters